Lieutenant Colonel Harry Greenwood,  (25 November 1881 – 5 May 1948) was a British Army officer and an English recipient of the Victoria Cross, the highest award for gallantry in the face of the enemy that can be awarded to British and Commonwealth forces.

Early life
Greenwood was born in Victoria Barracks, Windsor, the eldest of nine children to Charles Greenwood and Margaret Abernethy.

Military career
Greenwood was 36 years old, and an acting lieutenant colonel in the 9th Battalion, the King's Own Yorkshire Light Infantry, British Army, during the First World War, when he performed a deed for which he was awarded the Victoria Cross.

On 23 October 1918 at Ovillers, France, when the advance of the battalion was checked by enemy machine gun fire, Lieutenant-Colonel Greenwood single-handedly rushed the position and killed the crew. Subsequently, accompanied by two runners, he took another machine-gun post, but then found that his command was almost surrounded by the enemy, who started to attack. Repulsing this attack, the colonel led his troops forward, capturing the last objective with 150 prisoners, eight machine guns, and one field gun. On 24 October he again inspired his men to such a degree that the last objective was captured and the line held in spite of heavy casualties.

Later life
Greenwood died in Wimbledon, aged 66 and is buried at Putney Vale Cemetery. His medal is held at the King's Own Yorkshire Light Infantry Museum in Doncaster.

References

Further reading
Valour Beyond All Praise: Harry Greenwood VC (Derek Hunt 2003)

External links
News item "Harry Greenwood's Victoria Cross donated to the King's Own Yorkshire Light Infantry Museum"

1881 births
1948 deaths
Military personnel from Berkshire
People from Windsor, Berkshire
British Army personnel of the Second Boer War
British Army personnel of World War I
British Army personnel of World War II
British World War I recipients of the Victoria Cross
King's Own Yorkshire Light Infantry officers
Officers of the Order of the British Empire
Recipients of the Military Cross
Burials at Putney Vale Cemetery
Royal Pioneer Corps officers
Companions of the Distinguished Service Order
British Army recipients of the Victoria Cross